"Kashmiri Song" or "Pale Hands I Loved" is a 1902 song by Amy Woodforde-Finden based on a poem by Laurence Hope, pseudonym of Violet Nicolson.

The poem first appeared in Hope's first collection of poems, The Garden of Kama (1901), also known as India's Love Lyrics.

The following year, when Amy Woodforde-Finden set to music Four Indian Love Lyrics, "Kashmiri Song" emerged as the most popular, quickly becoming a drawing room standard and remaining popular until the Second World War.

Words

Interpretations 

The phrase "beside the Shalimar" presumably refers to one of two Shalimar Gardens, the Shalimar Gardens Kashmir or the Shalimar Gardens Lahore.  Although the former seems the likelier identification, given the song's title, the fact that Nicolson lived in Lahore gives some weight to the latter.

Recordings 

There have been numerous recordings of the song, including:
 Cellist Julian Lloyd Webber on the 2006 album Unexpected Songs
 One of only two Rudolph Valentino recordings, made in 1923.

Among famous singers to record the song in the inter-war years, there are 3 versions by Peter Dawson, two by Frank Titterton, and single versions by John McCormack and Richard Tauber.

Culture 

The song has led an unusually varied life particularly in the field of popular culture.  Some of the places where the song/poem is mentioned or quoted are:

 The film The Sheik (1921) starring Rudolph Valentino, based on the 1919 novel The Sheik by E. M. Hull.
 Ford Madox Ford's novel Parade's End (1924–1928).
 In the Srinigar section of his 1933 film India Speaks, Richard Halliburton asserts that everyone knows "the Kashmiri song".
 Jack Conroy's novel A World to Win (1935).
 Peter DeRose and Billy Hill's song "On a Little Street in Singapore" seems to reuse a lot of the same words (1939).
 The film This Happy Breed (1944), based on Noël Coward's stage play (1939).
 The film Hers to Hold (1943), sung by Deanna Durbin
 Ross MacDonald's novel, Dark Tunnel (1943)
 Anthony Gilbert's novel, The Black Stage (1945)
 The film Maytime in Mayfair (1948) refers to the song, suggesting it is a cliché.
 Henry Miller's novel, Sexus (1949)
 Daphne du Maurier's novel, The Parasites (1949)
 P. G. Wodehouse's novel, Ring for Jeeves (1953), quoted by captain Biggar
 Anthony Powell's novel, Casanova's Chinese Restaurant (1960), the fifth volume of A Dance to the Music of Time.
 Have Gun – Will Travel, episode 24 of season 6, “Caravan” (1961-62)
 Gilbert Sorrentino's novel Aberration of Starlight (1980)
 The poet Tom Holt's Lucia in Wartime (after E F Benson) (1985), where it is sung by Major Benjie.
 An episode of Agatha Christie's Poirot, 'Trouble at Sea' (1989)
 Salman Rushdie's novel, Midnight’s Children (1991), where Sabarmati plays it on a pianola.
 Vikram Seth's novel, A Suitable Boy (1993)
 A ghazal by Agha Shahid Ali (1997)
 Title of a short story by Anne Enright in her collection, Yesterday's Weather (2008).
 Lorrie Moore's novel, A Gate at the Stairs (2009)

References

External links 
Woodforde Family website
Kashmiri Song sheet music at Library of Congress
Maggie Teyte recording (1921) at Library of Congress

Songs written by Amy Woodforde-Finden
Indian songs
1902 songs
Songs about India
Songs based on poems

kashmiri song lyrics